Procoelambus macrocephalus is a species of beetle in the family Dytiscidae, the only species in the genus Procoelambus.

References

Dytiscidae
 01